Minnie is a 1922 American silent comedy film starring Leatrice Joy and co-directed by Marshall Neilan and Frank Urson. Neilan also wrote and produced the film which was released by Associated First National Pictures (later First National Pictures). It is not known whether the film currently survives, which suggests that it is a lost film.

Plot
As described in a film publication, Minnie (Joy), the homeliest girl in town, is devoted to her father (Barnum), a discouraged inventor who has been working on a wireless device. Subject to the sneers of her neighbors, Minnie "invents" a lover and sends herself letters and flowers. Her stepsister (Lynch) suspects the truth and threatens to expose her. Desperate, she claims an unidentified body at the morgue and tells a reporter (Moore) that this is her lover, unaware that the body is that of a Chinese man. The absent-minded reporter sees her heart and forgets about the big story. After further disappointments in the invention, Minnie's stepmother decides to leave her father. Her father then has a success and becomes rich. At a celebration, the stepsister and townspeople are surprised when a new couple appear, which turn out to be the former reporter and his lovely wife Minnie.

Cast
 Leatrice Joy as Minnie
 Matt Moore as Newspaperman
 George Barnum as Minnie's Father
 Josephine Crowell as Stepmother
 Helen Lynch as Stepsister
 Raymond Griffith as Chewing Gum Salesman
 Richard Wayne as Young Doctor
 Tom Wilson as Boardinghouse Janitor
 George Dromgold as Local Cut-Up

References

External links

Lantern slide (archived Wayback)

1922 films
1922 comedy films
Silent American comedy films
American silent feature films
American black-and-white films
Films directed by Marshall Neilan
First National Pictures films
American independent films
1920s independent films
1920s American films